Akae may refer to:

 (born 1933), Japanese novelist
 (born 1975), Japanese freelance announcer
Akae Beka is a roots reggae band
Aka-e, type of woodblock print
The oath that revealed the secrets of the cycles of the earth to Kasbeel

Japanese-language surnames